Lars Monrad-Krohn (born July 14, 1933) is a Norwegian engineer and entrepreneur.

He graduated from the Norwegian Institute of Technology, Institute for Radio Technology, (NTH, Institutt for Radioteknikk) in 1959. His master thesis addressed construction of computer core memory and was the first computer-oriented thesis handed in at NTH. As an entrepreneur, Monrad-Krohn established Norsk Data AS in 1967 (CEO 1967-1972), established A/S Mycron in 1975 (CEO 1975-1982), and established Tiki-Data in 1984 (CEO 1984-1996). He  teaches entrepreneurship at the Department of Informatics, University of Oslo.

He is a fellow of the Norwegian Academy of Technological Sciences.

References

1933 births
Living people
Norwegian electronics engineers
Norwegian company founders
Academic staff of the University of Oslo
Norwegian Institute of Technology alumni
Norsk Data people
Members of the Norwegian Academy of Technological Sciences